Li Tong (168–209), courtesy name Wenda, was a military general serving under the warlord Cao Cao during the late Eastern Han dynasty of China. Li Tong came to serve Cao Cao when the latter was at war with rival warlords Liu Biao and Zhang Xiu. During the battle of Battle of Nan Commandery in 208, Li Tong broke through the defence lines guarded by Guan Yu and supported Cao Ren at Jiangling. He fell sick during this time and eventually succumbed to illness. He had two sons: Li Xu and Li Ji.

In Romance of the Three Kingdoms
In the 14th-century historical novel Romance of the Three Kingdoms, Li Tong was defeated and slain by Ma Chao in a duel during the Battle of Tong Pass in 211.

See also
 Lists of people of the Three Kingdoms

Notes

References

 Chen, Shou (3rd century). Records of the Three Kingdoms (Sanguozhi).
 Luo, Guanzhong (14th century). Romance of the Three Kingdoms (Sanguo Yanyi).
 Pei, Songzhi (5th century). Annotations to Records of the Three Kingdoms (Sanguozhi zhu).

168 births
209 deaths
Generals under Cao Cao
Politicians from Xinyang
Officials under Cao Cao
Political office-holders in Henan
Han dynasty generals from Henan
Han dynasty politicians from Henan